Lucky Country, also titled Dark Frontier, is a 2009 Australian film starring Aden Young and Toby Wallace.

Plot summary
Set in 1902, the Australian Federation has been established for one year. Twelve-year-old Tom's beloved father Nat has dragged him and his sister Sarah to an isolated farm at the edge of the woods. However, Nat's dream of living off the land has died, as he loses his sanity.

When three ex-soldiers arrive at their cabin one night, Tom, like his father, believes they are providence. But their presence becomes more menacing when one of them reveals a secret: he's found gold. As the lure of gold infects everyone around him the cabin becomes a psychological battleground in which Tom's loyalty is put to the ultimate test.

Production
The film was shot in 16mm in late 2008.

References

External links

Press kit for film

Australian Western (genre) films
2000s English-language films
Films set in 1902
Films directed by Kriv Stenders
2009 Western (genre) films
2000s Australian films